E43, E-43 or E.43 may refer to:
 European route E43, a road in central Europe
 HMS E43, a United Kingdom E-class submarine commissioned in 1915
 M113 E43, a version of the Mercedes-Benz M113 engine